The Men's 1500 metre freestyle competition of the swimming events at the 2015 World Aquatics Championships was held on 8 August with the heats and 9 August with the final.

Records
Prior to the competition, the existing world and championship records were as follows.

Results

Heats
The heats were held at 10:48.

Final
The final was held on 9 August at 18:20.

Sun Yang did not swim the final, and he did not tell anyone that he had no intention of swimming. The next man on the list who would have taken his place in the final, was Pál Joensen from the Faroe Islands, but he did not get any message that he could swim in the final, and therefore lane 3 was empty during the final. Sun Yang said after the event that he had felt chest pain after winning the 800 m freestyle. He felt it again shortly before the final of 1500 m free, but he could not say at what time it was.

References

Men's 1500 metre freestyle